Protemblemaria punctata, the Warthead blenny, is a species of chaenopsid blenny endemic to the Atlantic coast of northeast Venezuela where it is found on shallow, sandy bottoms down to a depth of .  This fish can reach a maximum size of  TL.

References
 Cervigón, F. 1966. Los peces marinos de Venezuela (2 vols.). Estacion de. Investigaciones Marihas de Margarita, Caracas. Fundación Cientifica Los Roques. 1-951.

Fish of Venezuela
Endemic fauna of Venezuela
punctata
Taxonomy articles created by Polbot
Fish described in 1966
Taxa named by Fernando Cervigón